Terradillos is a town and municipality in the province of Salamanca, Spain. In ancient Roman times it was called Viminatium (not to be confused with the Serbian city of Viminacium).

References

Municipalities in the Province of Salamanca